Lodovico Alessandri (born 26 October 1903, date of death unknown) was a Brazilian fencer. He competed at the 1936 and 1948 Summer Olympics.

References

External links
 

1903 births
Year of death missing
Brazilian male épée fencers
Olympic fencers of Brazil
Fencers at the 1936 Summer Olympics
Fencers at the 1948 Summer Olympics
Brazilian male foil fencers
Brazilian male sabre fencers
20th-century Brazilian people